Qualification for the 2006 AFC U-17 Championship.

West Asia (Zone 1)

Group A

Group B

Group C

Group D

Central & South Asia (Zone 2)

Group E

Group F

Group G

Group H

Asean (Zone 3) 

 qualified as hosts.

Group I 

Laos won the group, but was later disqualified for fielding over-aged players in a U-13 tournament in Qatar.

Group J

Group K

East Asia (Zone 4)

Group L

Group M

Group N

Playoff Match 
Play-off for the last spot at the finals (the best second-placed teams from ASEAN and East Asia)

References
RSSSF Archive

Qual
AFC U-16 Championship qualification
Qual